SS501 is South Korean boy band SS501's first full length Japanese studio album.

Right after their first two Japanese maxi singles Kokoro and Distance, SS501 released their first full-length Japanese self-titled album, SS501 on October 24, 2007 by Pony Canyon.

The album consists of eleven songs: two singles from their first two maxi singles, "Kokoro" and "Distance"; two Japanese versions of "Again" and "4Chance" from their S.T 01 Now Korean studio album; and seven new songs.

Track listing

Music videos
 "Kokoro"
 "Distance"

Release history

References

External links

 
 

SS501 albums
2007 albums